Walther Rathenau (29 September 1867 – 24 June 1922) was a German industrialist, writer and liberal politician.

During the First World War of 1914–1918 he was involved in the organization of the German war economy. After the war, Rathenau served as German Foreign Minister (February to June 1922) of the Weimar Republic.

Rathenau initiated the 1922  Treaty of Rapallo, which removed major obstacles to trading with Soviet Russia. Although Russia was already aiding Germany's secret rearmament programme, right-wing nationalist groups branded Rathenau a revolutionary, also resenting his background as a successful Jewish businessman.

Two months after the signing of the treaty, Rathenau was assassinated by the right-wing paramilitary group Organisation Consul in Berlin. Some members of the public viewed Rathenau as a democratic martyr; after the Nazis came to power in 1933 they banned all commemoration of him.

Early life
Rathenau was born in Berlin to Emil Rathenau, a prominent Jewish businessman and founder of the Allgemeine Elektrizitäts-Gesellschaft (AEG), an electrical engineering company, and Mathilde Nachmann.

He studied physics, chemistry, and philosophy in Berlin and Strasbourg, and received a doctorate in physics in 1889 after studying under August Kundt. His German Jewish heritage and his accumulated wealth were both factors in establishing his deeply divisive reputation in German politics at a time of increasing widespread antisemitism in Germany.

He summed up his thoughts on growing up Jewish in Germany; communicating how his patriotism and loyalty to his country were no different than that of any fellow German regardless of religion or ethnicity:

I am a German of Jewish origin. My people are the German people, my home is Germany, my faith is German faith, which stands above all denominations.

He worked as a technical engineer in a Swiss aluminium factory, and then as a manager in a small electro-chemical firm in Bitterfeld, where he conducted experiments in electrolysis. He returned to Berlin and joined the AEG board in 1899, becoming a leading industrialist in the late German Empire and early Weimar Republic periods. In 1903 his younger and much more entrepreneurial brother Erich Rathenau died. Heartbroken, his father had to be satisfied with Walther's help instead. Walther Rathenau was a successful industrialist: in only a decade he set up power stations in Manchester, Buenos Aires, and Baku. AEG acquired ownership of a streetcar company in Madrid; and in East Africa he purchased a British firm. In total he was involved with 84 companies worldwide. AEG was particularly praised for vertical integration methods and a strong emphasis on supply chain management. Rathenau developed an expertise in business restructuring, turning companies around. High organizational capabilities made his company very rich, and it produced the standards for new chemicals development, such as acetone in Manchester. He made large profits from commercial lending on a wide industrial scale, and those profits were reinvested in capital and assets.

Supply chains for the World War 
An experienced journalist, Rathenau published in the Berliner Tageblatt an article accusing his own country of manipulating politics in Vienna.  As the dual monarchy's relations with Russia drifted, the paper described a secret conspiracy at work in Moltke's War department in which he had taken part.  During World War I his opinions hardened.  He held senior posts in the Raw Materials Department of the War Ministry and became chairman of AEG upon his father's death in 1915. Rathenau played a key role in convincing the War Ministry to set up the War Raw Materials Department (Kriegsrohstoffabteilung, KRA), of which he was put in charge from August 1914 to March 1915 and established the fundamental policies and procedures. His senior staff were on loan from industry. The KRA focused on raw materials threatened by the British blockade, as well as supplies from occupied Belgium and France. It set prices and regulated the distribution to vital war industries. It began the development of Ersatzkaisertum raw materials, developing supply chains to bring peace and for regime change within Germany. The KRA suffered many inefficiencies caused by the complexity and selfishness encountered from commerce, industry, and the government itself.

Personal character

Rathenau wrote about personal and social responsibility to the community at a time when solidarity was required to keep the peace. His characteristics were courage, vision, imagination, tenacity and creativity; yet he insisted technology come to the aid of manual labourers. So one of the joys of work included "pleasure from profit" to elevate society. According to one biographer he is said to have identified a sense of inferiority in society due to his Jewishness, writing that he: 

realised completely for the first time that he had come into this world as a second-class citizen and that no amount of ability and merit could ever free him from this condition.

One heavy criticism which he bore was the implication that Jews could never put Germany first; the idea that the Jews were "our misfortune", as the German nationalist historian Heinrich Treitschke wrote, led to the proliferation from 1880s of anti-Semitic parties. There were no Jewish officers in the whole Prussian Army – the ruling-class in the Imperial Officer Corps was both blatantly and latently anti-Semitic, eventually supporting the Nazis' anti-Semitic policies.

After Versailles (1919) he founded a "League for Industry", an offshoot of internationalism that blamed German defeat on a lack of industrial readiness. He wished to exculpate the blame for Germany's war guilt articulated through an acquaintance with Colonel House.

Postwar statesman 
Rathenau was a moderate liberal in politics, and after World War I, he was one of the founders of the German Democratic Party (German: Deutsche Demokratische Partei, DDP), but he moved to the left in the advent of post-war chaos. Passionate about rights of social equality, he rejected state ownership of industry and instead advocated greater worker participation in the management of companies. His ideas were influential in postwar governments. He was put forward as a socialist candidate for first President; but on standing in the Reichstag was dismissed amid "rows and shrieks of laughter" which visibly upset the man. Ebert's election by the Left failed to heal the deep rifts and social divisions in German society that occurred throughout the Weimar. Rathenau advised that a small town in central Germany was the wrong place for the capital and seat of Government. But his own adequacy was under-appreciated; immediately giving rise to extreme right-wing organizations within months of the Communist-inspired Spartacist Revolt, "the product of a state in which for centuries no one has ruled who was not a member of, or a convert to military feudalism...," he told the Reichstag, at once deploring the foundation of the Fatherland Party in 1917. In 1918 he established the ZAG living through his philosophy of Deutsche Gemeinwirtschaft a collective economic community.

Rathenau encouraged free traders and believed in the efficacy of "preparedness and directional efficiency". AEG was influential: his colleague Wichard von Moellendorff was appointed as Undersecretary of the Reich Economy Office; for a time in July 1919 they worked closely for Weimar with republican Rudolf Wissell. But Hindenburg's technocratic rational economic Programme was borrowed;  while Rathenau, being democratic, warned against short-termism. Berlin's March Days was a consequence of the internal struggle between Finance and Economic ministries. On 20 February 1919 he proposed workers councils. The plan for a Socialist League of nations was overtly pro-Union mocked as the "Paris League" – a throwback to the Second Communist International – they challenged openly for democratic ideas. But a rapprochement with Soviet Union was inspired by Rathenau; it tried to prevent an expansive 'Greater Germany'.

Rathenau was appointed Minister of Reconstruction, and in May 1921 held a second meeting with Lloyd George and the Reparations Committee. He established good relations with Aristide Briand who praised "a strong, healthy, booming Germany". The era of Erfüllungspolitik was high, altruistic self-confidence; he shared a pre-war fascination for the Hegelian Complex for a corporate Germany chastised by a reverence to a Supreme Being. He was wary of allied decadence, complacent, corrosive of an innocent romanticism expanded into mysticism. His ideas were challenged as "objectively impossible"; Weimar lacked clarity and leadership, while Rathenau was deterministic, and robust over the details. A Levée en masse would be part of this utilitarianism that bestrode his Menschen philosophies. This contradistinction about an "unravelled" Versailles which was incompatible with Fulfillment and the role of Reconstruction. Bravely Rathenau held out against the partition of Poland, despite Erzberger's assassination; and threats for extreme National Bolshevists when he joined Joseph Wirth's government after Cannes on 31 January 1922 led to a horrible fear that his days were numbered.

In 1922 he became Foreign Minister. Writing before the Genoa Conference that concern for his personal safety was prescient of a foreboding for his own death. The insistence that Germany should fulfill its obligations under the Treaty of Versailles, but work for a revision of its terms, infuriated extreme German nationalists. He also angered such extremists by negotiating the Treaty of Rapallo with the Soviet Union, which was signed on 16 April 1922, although the treaty implicitly recognized secret German–Soviet collaboration begun in 1921 that provided for the rearmament of Germany, including German-owned aircraft being manufactured in Russian territory. The leaders of the (still obscure) National Socialist German Workers' Party (German: Nationalsozialistische Deutsche Arbeiterpartei, abbreviated NSDAP) and other extremist groups falsely claimed he was part of a "Jewish-Communist conspiracy", despite the fact that he was a liberal German nationalist who had bolstered the country's recent war effort. The British politician Robert Boothby wrote of him, "He was something that only a German Jew could simultaneously be: a prophet, a philosopher, a mystic, a writer, a statesman, an industrial magnate of the highest and greatest order, and the pioneer of what has become known as 'industrial rationalization'." Despite his desire for economic and political co-operation between Germany and the Soviet Union, Rathenau remained skeptical of the methods of the Soviets:

The question of war reparations vexed Rathenau: Article 231 of the Treaty of Versailles imposed repayments that would take Germany decades to repay.  Expunging war guilt, converting it into financial and economic responsibility was critical to relations with the Big Four. Yet Rathenau was unable to convince Germans of its applicability. He talked in his "apocalyptic way about society, politics and the problems of responsibility." He was persuasive; the Entente would recognise, he urged, that Germany had to be "capable of discharging its obligations."

Philosophy of imagery

Philosopher for socialism
Although he never married, Rathenau did fall in love with Elisabeth 'Lili' Franziska Deutsch, (née Kahn), a society beauty and the wife of his father's business partner Felix Deutsch. She was the daughter of Bernhard and Emma Kahn (née Eberstadt) of Mannheim and the sister of, among others, composer Robert Kahn and Wall St. financier Otto Hermann Kahn. He related in a notebook titled Brevarium Mysticum finding revealed love in the sight of a soaring eagle, a soulful dedication on a sojourn in the Harz Mountains.  Walther was highly literate and intelligent, wrote several books with deep philosophical overtones. In Zur Kritik der Zeit contemporary human conditioning was critically examined on a sociological basis found in a life of business. This put together another critique into an intellectual context of 'mind over matter', social wisdom and corporate discipline as a framework in the socialistic sciences – Zur Mechanik des Geistes. Rathenau moved ever closer to a rejection of religion, embracing the power of science. He tried to bring people's attention to what changes would be required for a futuristic romantic movement in Von Kommenden Dingen to openly challenge the living of lives. Mechanistics rejected the central feature of Malthusian thoughts on human progress motivated by population growth. His focus was the importance of technology, rather than abstinence for standardisation, specialization and abstraction with positive approbation. The corollary for Rathenau of information-gathering was an exponential explosive growth in data that would enrich globalization. Rathenau delineated his arguments by dividing men into classifications: Mutmenschen and Furchtmenschen outlined the problems of mass migration across Europe which had resonance with the past. But he saw real significance for Zweckmenschen as utilitarian cunning to set the men of fear in motion. The philosophy amounted to Social Darwinism, but there was an unaccredited presumption of delphic adoration for the Greek Parnassus.

The theories of mechanization argued that competition could not go on forever as it died in love. Intellectual perorations were reached in pronouncements preceding a great vision for the future of German business. He cannot be directly held responsible for the mechanization of the Panzers movement, for his social idealism was grounded in Rousseau's Great Enlightenment Path. Pure mechanization would have to transmogrify psychological mutation, risk tragedy, and plunging into the abyss. Rathenau was assimilated by a love for St Francis Assisi, a message of service dedicated to the community that restricted his ambitions. A modified or applied mysticism, Rathenau's idea always expressed work as "a joy", and like Schopenhauer he rejected materialism and recognised its pitfalls, using a deep knowledge of technology to simultaneously warn of its dangers. This distinction with Soviet working methods of dialectical materialism was unwelcome in a Germany seeking to rearm. Thus he rallied ideas for management and control as Head of Raw Materials and efficacy of science.

Assassination and aftermath
On 24 June 1922, two months after the signing of the Treaty of Rapallo (which renounced German territorial claims from World War I), Rathenau was assassinated. On this Saturday morning, Rathenau had himself chauffeured from his house in Berlin-Grunewald to the Foreign Office in Wilhelmstraße. During the trip, his NAG convertible was passed by a Mercedes touring car with Ernst Werner Techow behind the wheel and Erwin Kern and Hermann Fischer in the backseats. Kern opened fire with an MP 18 submachine gun at close range, killing Rathenau almost instantly, while Fischer threw a hand grenade into the car before Techow quickly drove them away. Also involved in the plot were Techow's younger brother Hans Gerd Techow, future writer Ernst von Salomon, and Willi Günther (aided and abetted by seven others, some of them schoolboys). All conspirators were members of the ultra-nationalist secret Organisation Consul (O.C.). A memorial stone in the Königsallee in Grunewald marks the scene of the crime.

Rathenau's assassination was but one in a series of terrorist attacks by Organisation Consul. Most notable among them had been the assassination of former finance minister Matthias Erzberger in August 1921. While Fischer and Kern prepared their plot, former chancellor Philipp Scheidemann barely survived an attempt on his life by Organisation Consul assassins on 4 June 1922. Historian Martin Sabrow points to Hermann Ehrhardt, the undisputed leader of the Organisation Consul, as the one who ordered the murders. Ehrhardt and his men believed that Rathenau's death would bring down the government and prompt the Left to act against the Weimar Republic, thereby provoking civil war, in which the Organisation Consul would be called on for help by the Reichswehr. After an anticipated victory Ehrhardt hoped to establish an authoritarian regime or a military dictatorship. In order not to be completely delegitimized by the murder of Rathenau, Ehrhardt carefully saw to it that no connections between him and the assassins could be detected. Although Fischer and Kern connected with the Berlin chapter of the Organisation Consul to use its resources, they mainly acted on their own in planning and carrying out the assassination.The historian Michael Kellogg, argued that Vasily Biskupsky, Erich Ludendorff and his advisor Max Bauer, all members of the Aufbau Vereinigung, a group of tsarist exiles and early Nazis, colluded in the assassination of Rathenau, while the degree of their participation was not entirely clear.

The terrorists' aims were not achieved, however, and civil war did not come. Instead, millions of Germans gathered on the streets to express their grief and to demonstrate against counter-revolutionary terrorism. When the news of Rathenau's death became known in the Reichstag, the session turned into turmoil. DNVP politician Karl Helfferich in particular became the target of scorn because he had just recently uttered a vitriolic attack upon Rathenau. During the official memorial ceremony the next day, Chancellor Joseph Wirth from the Centre Party made a speech which soon became famous, in which, while pointing to the right side of the parliamentary floor, he used the well-known formula of Philipp Scheidemann: "There is the enemy – and there is no doubt about it: This enemy is on the right!"

The crime itself was soon cleared up. Willi Günther had bragged about his participation in public. After his arrest on 26 June, he confessed to the crime without holding anything back. Hans Gerd Techow was arrested the following day, Ernst Werner Techow, who was visiting his uncle, three days later. Fischer and Kern, however, remained on the loose. After a daring flight, which kept Germany in suspense for more than two weeks, they were finally spotted at Saaleck Castle in Thuringia, whose owner was himself a secret member of the Organisation Consul. On 17 July, they were confronted by two police detectives. While waiting for reinforcements during the stand-off, one of the detectives fired at a window, unknowingly killing Kern by a bullet in the head. Fischer then took his own life.

When the crime was brought to court in October 1922, Ernst Werner Techow was the only defendant charged with murder. Twelve more defendants were arraigned on various charges, among them Hans Gerd Techow and Ernst von Salomon, who had spied out Rathenau's habits and kept up contact with the Organisation Consul, as well as the commander of the Organisation Consul in Western Germany, Karl Tillessen, a brother of Erzberger's assassin Heinrich Tillessen, and his adjutant Hartmut Plaas. The prosecution left aside the political implications of the plot, but focused upon the issue of antisemitism. Ahead of his assassination, Rathenau had indeed been the frequent target of vicious antisemitic attacks, and the assassins had also been members of the violently antisemitic Deutschvölkischer Schutz- und Trutzbund. Kern had, according to Ernst Werner Techow, argued that Rathenau had to be murdered, because he had intimate relations with Bolshevik Russia, so that he had even married off his sister to the Communist Karl Radek – a complete fabrication – and that Rathenau himself had confessed to be one of the three hundred "Elders of Zion" as described in the notorious antisemitic forgery The Protocols of the Elders of Zion. But the defendants vigorously denied that they had killed Rathenau because he was Jewish. Neither was the prosecution able to fully uncover the involvement of the Organisation Consul in the plot. Thus Tillessen and Plaas were only convicted of non-notification of a crime and sentenced to three and two years in prison, respectively. Salomon received five years imprisonment for accessory to murder. Ernst Werner Techow narrowly escaped the death penalty because, in a last-minute confession, he managed to convince the court that he had only acted under the threat of death by Kern. Instead he was sentenced to fifteen years in prison for being an accessory to murder.

Initially, the reactions to Rathenau's assassination strengthened the Weimar Republic. As long as the Weimar Republic existed, the date 24 June remained a day of public commemorations. In public memory, Rathenau's death increasingly appeared to be a martyr-like sacrifice for democracy.

The situation changed with the Nazi seizure of power in 1933. The Nazis systematically wiped out public commemoration of Rathenau by destroying monuments to him, closing the Walther-Rathenau-Museum in his former mansion, and renaming streets and schools dedicated to him. Instead, a memorial plate to Kern and Fischer was solemnly unveiled at Saaleck Castle in July 1933 and in October 1933, a monument was erected on the assassins' grave.

The Nuremberg U-Bahn station Rathenauplatz is not only named after him but also bears his face in portrait along the walls.

Fictional portrayal
Rathenau is generally acknowledged to be, in part, the basis for the German noble and industrialist Paul Arnheim, a character in Robert Musil's novel The Man Without Qualities. Rathenau also appears as the ghostly subject of a Nazi seance in a famous scene in Thomas Pynchon's Gravity%27s Rainbow. In 2017, the events and aftermath of Rathenau's assassination were depicted in the first episode of the National Geographic series Genius.

Works
 Reflektionen (1908)
 Zur Kritik der Zeit (1912)
 Zur Mechanik des Geistes (1913)
 Von kommenden Dingen (1917)
 Vom Aktienwesen. Eine geschäftliche Betrachtung (1917)
 An Deutschlands Jugend (1918)
 Die neue Gesellschaft (1919) The New Society translated by Arthur Windham, (1921) New York: Harcourt, Brace and Co.
 Der neue Staat (1919)
 Der Kaiser (1919)
 Kritik der dreifachen Revolution (1919)
 Was wird werden (1920, a utopian novel)
 Gesammelte Schriften (6 volumes)
 Gesammelte Reden (1924)
 Briefe (1926, 2 volumes)
 Neue Briefe (1927)
 Politische Briefe (1929)

See also
 Contributions to liberal theory
 1920s Berlin
 Liberalism

Explanatory notes

References

Secondary sources
 Berger, Stefan, Inventing the Nation: Germany, London: Hodder, 2004.
 .
 
 Gilbert, Sir Martin, The First World War: A Complete History (London, 1971)
 
 
 
 
 Pois, Robert A., "Walther Rathenau's Jewish Quandary", Leo Baeck Institute Year Book (1968), Vol. 13, pp 120–131. 
 
 Strachan, Hew, The First World War: Volume I: To Arms (2001) pp. 1014–1049, on Rathenau and KRA in the war
 
 Wehler, Hans-Ulrich, The German Empire 1871–1918, Leamington: Berg, 1985.
 Williamson, D.G., "Walther Rathenau and the K.R.A. August 1914 – March 1915", in Zeitschrift für Unternehmensgeschichte (1978), issue 11, pp. 118–136.

Primary sources
 Vossiche Zeitung – a newspaper
 Tagebuch 1907–22 (Düsseldorf, 1967)
 Count Harry Kessler, Berlin in Lights: The Diaries of Count Harry Kessler (1918–1937) Grove Press (New York, 1999)
 Rathenau, W., Die Mechanisierung der Welt (Fr.) (Paris, 1972)
 Rathenau, W., Schriften und Reden (Frankfurt-am-Main, 1964)
 Rathenau, W., The Sacrifice to the Eumenides (1913)
 Walter Rathenau: Industrialist, Banker, Intellectual, And Politician; Notes And Diaries 1907–1922. Hartmut P. von Strandmann (ed.), Hilary von Strandmann (translator). Clarendon Press, 528 pages, in English. October 1985.  (hardcover).

Further reading

External links

 Walther Rathenau Gesellschaft e. V. 
 
 
 
 Speech by German President Friedrich Ebert at Rathenau's burial 
 

 
1867 births
1922 deaths
Assassinated German diplomats
Assassinated German politicians
Assassinated Jews
Businesspeople from Berlin
Engineers from Berlin
Deaths by firearm in Germany
Foreign Ministers of Germany
German anti-communists
German male writers
German science fiction writers
German terrorism victims
Government ministers of Germany
Jewish German politicians
Male murder victims
Organisation Consul victims
People from Steglitz-Zehlendorf
People from the Province of Brandenburg
People murdered in Berlin
Soldiers of the French Foreign Legion
Weimar Republic politicians
Writers from Berlin
1922 murders in Germany
1920s murders in Berlin